Horseshoe Bay is a city in Llano and Burnet counties in the U.S. state of Texas.

Situated on Lake Lyndon B. Johnson and the south branch of the Colorado River, it is known in the region for its golf courses, hotel and resort, and water sports. Prior to its incorporation in September 2005, it was a census-designated place (CDP). The CDP population was 3,337 at the 2000 census. The 2010 census put the population at 3,418. The 2020 Decennial Census reported population was 4,257.

Geography

Horseshoe Bay is located at  (30.544814, –98.368428). It is located primarily in Llano County and extends eastward into Burnet County, on the southern shore of Lake Lyndon B. Johnson.

Demographics

2020 census

As of the 2020 United States census, there were 4,257 people, 2,040 households, and 1,309 families residing in the city.

2000 census
As of the census of 2000, there were 3,337 people, 1,623 households, and 1,186 families residing in the CDP. The population density was 142.8 people per square mile (55.1/km2). There were 2,773 housing units at an average density of 118.7/sq mi (45.8/km2). The racial makeup of the CDP was 96.22% White, 0.33% African American, 0.24% Native American, 0.78% Asian, 1.47% from other races, and 0.96% from two or more races. Hispanic or Latino of any race were 4.29% of the population.

There were 1,623 households, out of which 11.6% had children under the age of 18 living with them, 68.5% were married couples living together, 2.8% had a female householder with no husband present, and 26.9% were non-families. 24.0% of all households were made up of individuals, and 12.1% had someone living alone who was 65 years of age or older. The average household size was 2.06 and the average family size was 2.37.

In the CDP, the population was spread out, with 10.6% under the age of 18, 3.4% from 18 to 24, 15.0% from 25 to 44, 36.2% from 45 to 64, and 34.8% who were 65 years of age or older. The median age was 58 years. For every 100 females, there were 95.7 males. For every 100 females age 18 and over, there were 95.7 males.

The median income for a household in the CDP was $54,073, and the median income for a family was $65,324. Males had a median income of $39,375 versus $23,019 for females. The per capita income for the CDP was $36,254. About 5.8% of families and 6.1% of the population were below the poverty line, including 9.2% of those under age 18 and 4.7% of those age 65 or over.

Education
The Llano County portion of Horseshoe Bay is served by the Llano Independent School District. The Burnet County portion is served by the Marble Falls Independent School District.

Climate
The climate in this area is characterized by hot, humid summers and generally mild to cool winters.  According to the Köppen Climate Classification system, Horseshoe Bay has a humid subtropical climate, abbreviated "Cfa" on climate maps.

References

External links
 City of Horseshoe Bay official website
 
 Horseshoe Bay Beacon newspaper
 The Highlander newspaper

Cities in Burnet County, Texas
Cities in Llano County, Texas
Cities in Texas
Former census-designated places in Texas
Populated places established in 2005